The South East Cape is a cape located at the southernmost point of the main island of Tasmania, the southernmost state of Australia.

Location and features

South East Cape is the southernmost point of the mainland of Tasmania but not of the state of Tasmania. The Maatsuyker Islands and the Pedra Branca island group, just offshore, are also part of the state of Tasmania and lie further south than South East Cape. The state of Tasmania also includes Macquarie Island, which is about 1,600 km SE of South East Cape.

South East Cape is one of the five southernmost capes that can be rounded by Southern Ocean sailors.

The cape is also a reference point for sectors of the southern coastline of Tasmania. Much sea traffic passes near it, and many ships and boats have been wrecked or grounded there.

See also

 South West Cape
 South Coast Track
 Extreme points of Australia

References

External links 
 Continental Extremities of Australia
 Picture of South East Cape
 Map of the area with South East Cape on the right edge, South Cape, South West Cape, the Maatsuyker Islands with De Witt Island, The Sisters and Maatsuyker Island
 Another map of the area between South East Cape and South West Cape and the Maatsuyker Islands

Southern Tasmania
Headlands of Tasmania
South coast of Tasmania